Fang Wenping (born October 1950) is a general in the People's Liberation Army of China. Fang obtained the rank of major general in 2002. He was investigated by the PLA's anti-graft agency in March 2014. Previously he served as Commander of Shanxi Military District and a Standing Committee of the CCP Shanxi Provincial Committee.

Life and career
Fang was born and raised in Beijing, capital of China. He began his political career in February 1968, and joined the Chinese Communist Party in March 1970. He served in various posts in the 27th Army and over a period of six years worked his way up to the position of Head of the Rear-service Department. In 2000, he was appointed Chief of Staff of Hebei Military District, he remained in that position until 2005, when he was transferred to Shanxi and appointed Commander of Shanxi Military District, a year later, he concurrently served as a Standing Committee of the CCP Shanxi Provincial Committee. In March 2014, he was placed under investigation by the PLA's anti-corruption agency. In May 2014, he was transferred to judicial organs.

References

  

  

1950 births
Living people
People's Liberation Army generals from Beijing